Hell's Belles are a fictional super villain team in the Marvel Comics Universe, composed of female mutant terrorists.

Hell's Belles may also refer to:

 Hell's Belles (film), a 1969 biker film
 HellsBelles, a British heavy metal band formed from the ashes of Discharge in 1984
 Hell's Belles (band), an all-female AC/DC cover band, originally from Seattle, Washington

See also
 Hell's Bells (disambiguation)